Remigio Guido Barbieri, O.S.B. (1836–1910) was an Italian-born Roman Catholic bishop who served as the Vicar Apostolic of Gibraltar from 1901 to 1910.

Life
Remigio Barbieri was born in Siena in the Grand Duchy of Tuscany of a noble Florentine family on 5 September 1836.
He professed as a member of the Order of Saint Benedict on 20 June 1857 and ordained a priest of that order on 24 March 1861. Barbieri devoted the greater part of his life to the education of youth.

In 1896 he became Abbot of San Pietro, Perugia. He was appointed the Vicar Apostolic of Gibraltar and Titular Bishop of Theodosiopolis by Pope Leo XIII on 29 July 1901. His consecration to the Episcopate took place on 10 November 1901; the principal consecrator was Vincenzo Vannutelli, Cardinal-Bishop of Palestrina, with Giustino Adami, Titular Archbishop of Caesarea Ponti, and Edmund Stonor, Titular Archbishop of Trapezus, serving as co-consecrators. He penned the article on the "Vicariate of Gibraltar" for the Catholic Encyclopedia.

Bishop Barbieri died in office on 15 April 1910, aged 73.

References

1836 births
1910 deaths
19th-century Roman Catholic bishops of Gibraltar
Bishops of Siena
Italian Benedictines
Contributors to the Catholic Encyclopedia